Michael Patrick Nolan, Baron Nolan,  (10 September 1928 – 22 January 2007) was a judge in the United Kingdom, and from 1994 until 1997 was the first chairman of the Committee on Standards in Public Life. In the words of his obituary in The Guardian, "Lord Nolan .. made a profound mark on national life by substantially cleansing the Augean stable of corrupt politics as founding chairman of the Committee on Standards in Public Life."

Early and private life
Nolan was the son of James Nolan, a solicitor, and his wife, Jane Nolan. His father's family had left County Kerry in the mid-19th century. Lord Nolan cited his parents as "the first and foremost influences on my life". The Nolan family lived in Bexhill-on-Sea. He, his elder brother, James "Jim" Nolan (died 2001) and his nephews, James, Rossa and Luke, all attended Ampleforth College.

After two years of national service in the Royal Artillery, from 1947 to 1949, he read law at Wadham College, Oxford, where he was awarded an honorary fellowship in 1992. His contemporaries at Oxford included Patrick Mayhew and Stephen Tumim, both of whom became close friends.

He married Margaret Noyes, whom he met at Oxford, in 1953; she was the younger daughter of the poet Alfred Noyes. They had one son and four daughters. They kept a second home on the Côte d'Azur.

Legal career
Nolan was called to the bar at the Middle Temple in 1953, and specialised in tax law. He became a Queen's Counsel (QC) in 1968, and was called to the Bar in Northern Ireland in 1974, becoming a QC in Northern Ireland at the same time. He was a member of the Bar Council in 1973 to 1974, and a member of the Senate of the Inns of Court from 1974 to 1980. He became a bencher at Middle Temple in 1975. He was a member of the Sandilands Committee on Inflation Accounting from 1973 to 1975.

He was a Recorder in the Crown Court in Kent from 1975 to 1982, when he was appointed as a High Court judge and assigned to the Queen's Bench Division, receiving the customary knighthood. In 1984, during the miners' strike, he granted injunctions to the National Coal Board to prevent the National Union of Mineworkers using flying pickets. He was Presiding Judge of the Western Circuit from 1985 to 1988.

He was promoted to the Court of Appeal in 1991, joining the Privy Council. He heard appeals in many high-profile cases, including the case brought by relatives of the football spectators who died at Hillsborough in 1989, and in the case to review the decision not to bring prosecutions after the Marchioness disaster in 1989.

He sat with the Master of the Rolls, Lord Donaldson of Lymington, in M v Home Office, finding Home Secretary Kenneth Baker guilty of contempt of court after he refused to bring an asylum seeker back from Zaire, where he had been deported contrary to an earlier court order. He also sat in the constitution of the Court of Appeal which quashed the conviction of Judith Ward for involvement in the bombing of a coach on the M62 in 1974.

After just over two years in the Court of Appeal, he was promoted to the House of Lords in January 1994, becoming a Lord of Appeal in Ordinary and receiving a life peerage as a Law lord, taking the title Baron Nolan, of Brasted in the County of Kent.

He retired as a law lord in 1998.

Committee on Standards in Public Life
Lord Nolan chaired the Committee on Standards in Public Life from 1994 to 1997. The Committee was set up in late 1994 by John Major's government after the cash-for-questions affair, and has conducted numerous other inquiries. Its first report in 1995 created waves by recommending full disclosure of MPs' outside interests.  He also produced a report in standards of conduct in local government in July 1997.

The principles embodied and articulated in the first report have since become embedded in public life in Britain, and are often referred to eponymously as the Nolan Principles.

Later life
Nolan continued to serve in a public role in his retirement.

In 2000, at the request of Cardinal Cormac Murphy-O'Connor, he investigated the issue of paedophile priests in the Nolan Report.

Outside of the law, he was also Chancellor of the University of Essex  from 1997 to 2002, a Deputy Lieutenant of Kent and a Knight of St Gregory.

In retirement, Lord Nolan suffered from an unspecified degenerative disease, dying in 2007 at age 78. He was survived by his wife, their son and four daughters, and twelve grandchildren.

Honours

Commonwealth honours
 Commonwealth honours

Scholastic

 Chancellor, visitor, governor, rector and fellowships

Honorary degrees

Notes

References
Obituary, The Times, 25 January 2007
Obituary, The Daily Telegraph, 25 January 2007
Obituary, The Guardian, 26 January 2007
 Obituary, The Independent, 26 January 2007

1928 births
2007 deaths
Alumni of Wadham College, Oxford
Chancellors of the University of Essex
Deputy Lieutenants of Kent
20th-century English judges
Nolan, Baron 
Members of the Privy Council of the United Kingdom
People educated at Ampleforth College
People from Brasted
People from Bexhill-on-Sea
Queen's Bench Division judges
Members of the Judicial Committee of the Privy Council
English Roman Catholics
British Roman Catholics
Knights Bachelor
20th-century British Army personnel
Royal Artillery personnel
Member of the Committee on Standards in Public Life